Liabellum is a genus of Mexican plants in the tribe Liabeae within the family Asteraceae.

Species
The only known species is Liabellum hintoniorum, native to México State in central México.

formerly included
see Microliabum Sinclairia 
 Liabellum angustissimum  - Sinclairia angustissima  
 Liabellum cervinum  - Sinclairia cervina  
 Liabellum gentryi  - Sinclairia gentryi  
 Liabellum humile  - Microliabum humile  
 Liabellum palmeri - Sinclairia palmeri

References

Liabeae
Monotypic Asteraceae genera
Endemic flora of Mexico